The Jacob and Amelia Tuohino Farm, in Hamlin County, South Dakota, is a historic farm dating from c.1899 which was listed on the National Register of Historic Places in 1985.  It is located one mile south of South Dakota Highway 28, five miles west of Lake Norden.

The house is a one-and-a-half-story frame structure on a rock foundation.  It has intersecting gable roofs.

The property has various outbuildings including an old barn, a granary, and a sauna which was built c.1914-15.

References

		
National Register of Historic Places in South Dakota
Buildings and structures completed in 1899
Hamlin County, South Dakota